The Best So Far is the sixth album from Contemporary Christian music singer Cindy Morgan.  This greatest hits collects tracks from her first five albums.

Track listing
All songs written by Morgan, except where noted.
 "Love Is the Answer" Powell, Rundgren, Sulton, Wilcox – 4:20
 "Tell Me That You Love Me" – 4:24
 "Picture Me in Paradise" Cunningham, Hammond – 5:36
 "It's Gonna Be Heaven" Cunningham, Hammond – 4:08
 "Sweet Days of Grace" Hammond, Morgan – 3:58
 "How Could I Ask For More" – 3:33
 "Real Life" Morgan, Thurman, Thurman – 4:14
 "Listen" – 3:45
 "Let It Be Love" Cunningham, Hammond – 5:36
 "I Will Be Free" – 4:55
 "I'll Stand" Hammond, Morgan, Sims – 4:05
 "Praise the King" – 3:54
 "I Know You" – 4:38
 "Take My Life" – 4:38

Cindy Morgan (singer) albums
1999 greatest hits albums
Contemporary Christian music compilation albums